Duncan Beard Site, also known as the Duncan Beard's House and Shop, is an archaeological site located near Odessa, New Castle County, Delaware. It was the site of the house and shop of a Delaware lock-maker of great distinction and silversmith.  He lived and labored here for about 30 years until his death in 1797. He was a prominent member of Old Drawyers Presbyterian Church and made a contract with State of Delaware in 1776 for the manufacture of gun locks.

It was listed on the National Register of Historic Places in 1973.

References

Archaeological sites on the National Register of Historic Places in Delaware
Geography of New Castle County, Delaware
National Register of Historic Places in New Castle County, Delaware